Cats & Dogs is a 2001 spy-comedy film directed by Lawrence Guterman and written by John Requa and Glenn Ficarra.  It stars Jeff Goldblum, Elizabeth Perkins and Alexander Pollock, with the voices of (among others) Tobey Maguire, Alec Baldwin, Sean Hayes, Susan Sarandon, Charlton Heston, Jon Lovitz, Joe Pantoliano and Michael Clarke Duncan. The story centers on the relationships between cats and dogs, depicting the relationship as an intense rivalry in which both sides use organizations and tactics that mirror those used in human espionage. It was released by Warner Bros. Pictures on July 4, 2001. The film received mixed reviews and earned $200.7 million on a $60 million budget.

Plot 

The Brody family's pet Bloodhound Buddy chases a cat and is captured by other cats in an ambush. Cats and dogs are revealed to be highly intelligent, tech-savvy enemies capable of speech, waging war with covert operatives while concealing their true nature from humans. After an Anatolian Shepherd dog named Butch reports Buddy's capture to his superiors, the best canine agents are dispatched to complete Buddy's mission: to prevent the cats from making all humans allergic to dogs.

At a local barn, a litter of Beagle puppies mock their youngest brother for trying to escape captivity. A Doberman Pinscher agent replaces the litter with a pack of Miniature Pinscher agents, failing to notice the youngest Beagle. Carolyn, the Brodys’ matriarch, arrives to adopt a new dog and selects the Beagle, naming him Lou after her son Scotty sarcastically suggests the name "Loser".

After detonating an explosive trap laid by cats for Lou, Butch – mistaking him for a trained operative – brings him to the dogs’ underground network, and introduces agents Peek, a Chinese Crested Dog, and Sam, an Old English Sheepdog. Realizing Lou is a civilian, Butch raises his concerns to his superiors but is rebuffed. Lou is briefed on the origins of the conflict between cats and dogs, dating back to Ancient Egypt when cats ruled the world. Butch reveals that Buddy has escaped the cats and the spy trade, retiring to a condo in Boca Raton.

Meanwhile, Mr. Tinkles, a white Persian cat, plans to exploit the Brodys’ patriarch Professor Charles’ research on dog allergies to conquer the world. His scheming is interrupted by Sophie, his comatose owner's maid, who enjoys dressing Tinkles in embarrassing costumes. Tinkles orders his sidekick Calico, an Exotic Shorthair, to send Devon Rex ninjas to steal the research. Lou foils the theft and meets a former agent and Butch's ex-girlfriend Ivy, a Saluki who encourages him to bond with Scotty.

Mr. Tinkles contracts a Russian Blue mercenary named Dimitri Kennelkoff, who tricks Lou and places a bomb on Brody's lab door. Kennelkoff battles Lou and Butch, damaging the Brodys’ house until Butch disables the bomb and captures Kennelkoff. During the interrogation, the dogs recover a note by Mr. Tinkles from Kennelkoff's stomach.

After a breakthrough involving Lou playing with Scotty, Charles' machine finally finds the formula to a cure for human allergies to dogs. Having bugged the house, Mr. Tinkles and Calico spring a trap for the Brodys. First, Mr. Tinkles travels to a Christmas tree flocking plant under the guise of the plant's comatose owner, Mr. Mason, and sends the employees home, then lures the Brodys with fake tickets to a soccer exhibition game, capturing the family.

The dogs receive a video from Mr. Tinkles demanding Charles’ research as a ransom for the Brodys, and dogs around the world assemble at a meeting, led by a Mastiff. When the assembly decides not to surrender the formula, Lou confronts Butch. Revealing that he was abandoned by his owner, the unsympathetic Butch leaves Lou behind. Desperate, Lou brings Mr. Tinkles the research and is double-crossed. Butch, realizing what has happened, stages a raid of Mr. Tinkles' factory where mice are being prepared to spread the mass-produced allergy.

While Butch, Ivy, Peek, and Sam fight Tinkles' cat forces, Lou frees the Brodys and Calico, who was betrayed by Tinkles, revealing to the family that he can speak. Lou defeats Tinkles but is struck by an excavator as an explosion destroys the whole factory. Butch rescues the seemingly dead Lou, tearfully admitting that Lou was right to love his adoptive family, and Lou awakens. He decides to return to a normal pet's life with the Brodys until he can serve as a full-grown agent.

Meanwhile, Tinkles is sent to live with Sophie and her three sisters, with even more humiliating outfits as punishment for his actions against the dogs.

Cast 
 Jeff Goldblum as Professor Charles Brody
 Elizabeth Perkins as Mrs. Carolyn Brody
 Alexander Pollock as Scotty Brody
 Miriam Margolyes as Sophie the Maid

Voice cast 
 Tobey Maguire as Louis "Lou" Brody: a Beagle, who lives with the Brody family.
 Alec Baldwin as Butch: An Anatolian Shepherd, an experienced field agent, and Lou's mentor.
 Sean Hayes as Mr. Tinkles: A Persian cat; the leader of the cat agents, who seeks to defeat all dogs and rule the world.
 Susan Sarandon as Ivy: A Saluki; "domestically challenged" former-dog agent who has a history with Butch. Lou meets Ivy when he trains to be an agent.
 Charlton Heston as The Mastiff: An English Mastiff, and the leader of the dog agents.
 Jon Lovitz as Calico: An Exotic Shorthair cat, and Mr. Tinkles' second-in-command.
 Joe Pantoliano as Peek, a Chinese Crested Dog agent.
 Michael Clarke Duncan as Sam, an Old English Sheepdog agent.
 Billy West as Ninja Siamese Cat #1
 Danny Mann as Ninja Siamese Cat #2
 Glenn Ficarra as Dimitri Kennelkoff / The Russian: A Russian Blue cat agent, who is sent to detonate an explosive at Professor Brody's lab.
 Paul Pape as Wolf Blitzer of Canine News Network (CNN)
 Victor Wilson as Doberman Drill Sergeant
 Charles Howerton as the German Shepherd at Dog Headquarters
 Richard Steven Horvitz as the Puppy at Barn
 John Michael Higgins as Ginger Kitten

Puppeteers 

 Adam Behr
 Kevin Carlson
 Alejandro Diaz
 Randi Kaplan
 John Kennedy
 Luke Khanlian
 Bruce Lanoil
 Drew Massey
 Gordon Robertson
 Michelan Sisti
 Allan Trautman
 Emmanuel Reynolds

Production 
The film was shot in Vancouver, British Columbia and Eagle Creek Studios in Burnaby, British Columbia from June 19 to November 17, 2000. Lou's doghouse was filmed on Stage 1, Mr. Mason's office and the interior of the tree flocking factory was filmed on Stage 2, and the international meeting with the dogs was filmed on Stage 3, while the backyard of the Brody house was filmed on the studio backlot, and the front exterior of the Brody house was filmed at 1661 W 45th Avenue in Vancouver.

Release 
Cats & Dogs was released with the classic Looney Tunes short "Chow Hound" which was also seen in the movie itself. When released on Independence Day 2001, the film opened at #1, beating out Scary Movie 2 as it grossed $21.7 million over the Friday to Sunday span, averaging $7,140 from 3,040 theaters. It grossed $35.8 million over the Wednesday to Sunday span. It dropped 44% the following weekend, dropping to the #3 spot, grossing $12 million, falling behind Legally Blonde and The Score, and bringing its 12-day gross to $58.9 million. The film grossed $93.4 million in the US and $107.3 million overseas, for a total of $200.7 million worldwide on a $60 million budget.

Cats & Dogs was released on VHS and DVD on October 23, 2001. The alternate ending that shows Sophie instead taking Mr. Tinkles to a pet hospital to be neutered was also included as one of the extras. It was later released on Blu-ray on July 20, 2010; 10 days before the release of its sequel, The Revenge of Kitty Galore.

The soundtrack by composer John Debney was released in 2001.  It includes What's New Pussycat? by Tom Jones.

Reception 
Cats & Dogs has a 54% approval rating at Rotten Tomatoes based upon 117 reviews (63 positive, 54 negative) and an average rating of 5.5/10. The site's critical consensus reads: "A great concept, but the movie fails to develop the characters and some of the jokes are hit-or-miss." On Metacritic, the film has a weighted average score of 47 out of 100 based upon 26 reviews, indicating "mixed or average reviews".

The Washington Post'''s Jane Horwitz called it "[a] surprisingly witty and sophisticated spy movie spoof that will tickle adult pet lovers and still capture kids 6 and older with its boy-and-his-dog love story and pet slapstick." Roger Ebert gave the film 3 stars out of 4, praising the special effects and the CGI. In contrast, Kenneth Turan of the Los Angeles Times wrote "Irritating, childish and more frantic than funny, Cats & Dogs does manage some few pleasant moments, but they are not worth waiting for."Cats & Dogs was nominated for the Young Artist Award for Best Feature Film (Comedy) and Best Performance in a Feature Film - Leading Young Actor (Alexander Pollock). John Debney won the ASCAP Award for his musical contribution to this film as well as The Princess Diaries and Spy Kids.

Heston received the 2001 Razzie Award for Worst Supporting Actor for his involvement in three films that year, including his role as The Mastiff.

 Sequels 

 Cats & Dogs: The Revenge of Kitty Galore (2010) 

A sequel titled Cats & Dogs: The Revenge of Kitty Galore entered production in September 2008 under the direction of Brad Peyton and was released on July 30, 2010. Michael Clarke Duncan, Joe Pantoliano, and Sean Hayes reprise their roles as Sam, Peek, and Mr. Tinkles while Nick Nolte and Wallace Shawn replace Alec Baldwin and Jon Lovitz as Butch and Calico; and Charlton Heston, who voiced The Mastiff from the first film, died from pneumonia on April 5, 2008. In this film, Lou is now an adult and is voiced by Neil Patrick Harris. James Marsden, Christina Applegate, and Bette Midler voice new characters named Diggs, Catherine, and Kitty Galore respectively.

 Cats & Dogs 3: Paws Unite! (2020) 

A third installment and stand-alone sequel, subtitled Paws Unite!'', features a new storyline taking place 10 years after the events of the previous film. However, unlike the previous two, the third film has been released as a straight-to-video release on digital on September 15, 2020, and on DVD and Blu-ray on October 13, 2020. It is also the only film to not have any of the original cast members. The new voice cast includes Melissa Rauch, Max Greenfield and George Lopez. It was directed by Sean McNamara, co-produced by Andrew Lazar and David Fliegel, and written by Scott Bindley. It is distributed by Warner Bros. Home Entertainment. The movie received a nationwide theatrical release in Australia on September 24, 2020, and in the UK on October 2, 2020.

References

External links 

 
 
 
 
 

2001 films
2000s action comedy films
2000s adventure films
American action adventure films
American action comedy films
2000s spy comedy films
American buddy comedy films
American slapstick comedy films
Australian action comedy films
2000s English-language films
Films directed by Lawrence Guterman
Puppet films
Films scored by John Debney
Films about animals
Films about cats
Films about dogs
Films about pets
Films with live action and animation
Films shot in Vancouver
Village Roadshow Pictures films
Warner Bros. films
2000s buddy comedy films
2001 directorial debut films
2001 comedy films
Cats & Dogs (film series)
Golden Raspberry Award winning films
2000s American films
Talking dog films